Soldier is a 1998 Indian Hindi-language action thriller film directed by Abbas–Mustan starring Bobby Deol, Preity Zinta and Raakhee Gulzar. This was the first of several films where Deol collaborated with Abbas–Mustan.

Although Soldier was Zinta's first film, Mani Ratnam's  ended up being released before Soldier and was thus Zinta's film debut. Soldier was the first film in Abbas–Mustan's career which was not a Hollywood remake or adaptation.

According to film writer Shyam Goel, it was inspired by a real incident that happened in Punjab where a woman's forehead was branded with the message that her husband was a traitor. Her husband, a soldier, was accused of treachery, and she was thrown out of her village. The story was already made as a movie in Tamil in 1989 titled , starring Sathyaraj in dual roles.

Soldier released on 20 November 1998 and was declared as a superhit by Box Office India, becoming the 2nd highest-grossing film of the year in India after .

At the 44th Filmfare Awards, Soldier received 5 nominations, including Best Director (Abbas–Mustan) and Best Supporting Actress (Raakhee), and won 2 awards, including Best Female Debut (Zinta, also for ).

Plot 
In Barmer, 1978, corrupt Indian army officials Pratap Singh, Virender Sinha, Baldev Sinha and Jaswant Dalal have been stealing arms and ammunition led by a mysterious man known only as DK. Major Vijay Malhotra, a competent and high-ranking soldier, catches them in the act but is murdered by DK.

20 years later, the Mumbai Police get a fax from the Australian Interpol branch regarding Jaswant, now a wanted illegal arms supplier. An operation to capture him is handed over to ACP Dinesh Kapoor, an old friend of the late Major Vijay Malhotra, who informs a mysterious man known as Vicky. He wants Vicky to intercept Jaswant and not let the police capture him. Vicky succeeds but when Jaswant tries to kill him, Vicky shoots him.

Vicky travels to Sydney using information from Dinesh and woos Pratap Singh's daughter, Preeti. After all these years, Pratap, Virender, and Baldev have become high-profile arms dealers and live in Australia. After hearing of Jaswant's death and DK's involvement, they worry about betrayal from one another as each of them have secret files that incriminates the entire group.

Vicky meets with Pratap, who identifies him as Jaswant's killer and proposes a way to help make him more powerful. Baldev and his son Jojo realize that Vicky's mother is none other than Virender's wife, Shanti. Vicky is welcomed into Virender's gang. Virender is ecstatic to reunite with his son and happier to learn that he is in love with Pratap's daughter. He wants to use this to his advantage and have Vicky retrieve Pratap's secret file. Vicky instead shoots his father dead and retrieves his secret file, with which he discovers who DK actually is. Vicky convinces Baldev that Pratap betrayed them and killed Virender. Baldev rallies all his henchmen to launch an attack on Pratap but they are killed by Pratap's men. It is revealed that Vicky was working with Pratap to eliminate Virender's gang.

Vicky then reveals to Pratap that he is not actually Virender's son. He used Shanti to get closer to Virender and did the same for Pratap by using Preeti. The reason for all this is because DK gave him a contract to kill not just Jaswant but all the other partners so that he can own 100% of their crime organization. Vicky says that because of Preeti, he will instead kill DK and make Pratap the king. Pratap agrees to go to India with Vicky to kill DK.

After overhearing this, Preeti reveals it to Shanti. Shanti acknowledges that Vicky is not her son and that she had masterminded the plan to kill her husband and his business partners, whose weapons had accidentally killed her own son, unbeknownst to Virender. She reveals that Vicky is actually Raju, the son of Vijay. After Vijay's death, he had been framed for the gang's crimes and labeled a traitor. He was stripped of all medals, and their community ostracized his wife, Geeta, and son Raju. The villagers prevented Vijay's body from being cremated and threw it in the desert, where it became lost in a sandstorm. Raju separated from his mother, who stayed at a temple while he was raised with Shanti. Raju had been seeking revenge and justice for his father, and upon learning everything, Preeti agrees to assist him.

Dinesh releases Jaswant, who is revealed to be alive and had been helping Raju to finish off Virender's gang. Raju arrives in Barmer with Pratap and takes him to his mother's temple. He reveals to a shocked Pratap that he is Vijay Malhotra's son. DK is revealed to be none other than Jaswant in disguise. Jaswant's henchmen overpower Raju and Dinesh. A sandstorm ensues and gives Raju an advantage to kill the henchmen. Pratap and Jaswant confess their crimes to the villagers brought by Preeti. The two are then left to be eaten alive by vultures. With his name cleared, Major Vijay Malhotra is declared a martyr and given an honorable memorial ceremony.

Cast 
Raakhee Gulzar as Geeta Malhotra, Raju's mother
Bobby Deol as Raju Malhotra / Vicky
Preity Zinta as Preeti Singh
Farida Jalal as Shanti Sinha
Johnny Lever as Mohan / Sohan
Suresh Oberoi as Pratap Singh
Dalip Tahil as Virendra Sinha
Sharat Saxena as Baldev Sinha
Ashish Vidyarthi as Asst Commissioner of Police Dinesh Kapoor
Salim Ghouse as Jaswant Dalal / DK
Sheetal Suvarna as Sheetal
Jeetu Verma as Jojo Sinha
Kulbhushan Kharbanda as Police Commissioner 
Pankaj Dheer as Vijay Malhotra, Raju's father (special appearance)
Amrit Patel as hotel owner
Pranav Bajpai as Baaldaar
Narendra Bedi as taxi driver
Vivek Vaswani as a college principal

Soundtrack 
The soundtrack was composed by Anu Malik and was a hit amongst the audience. It was a key point in the success of the film. Lyrics were penned by Sameer.

Reception 
Khalid Mohamed gave Soldier 2 out of 5 stars, writing that it "leaves you feeling ever so much older and colder." Madhur Mittal of The Tribune said that it "boasts of terrific production and technical values", calling it a "a taut thriller".

Awards 

 44th Filmfare Awards:

Won

 Best Female Debut – Preity Zinta
 Best Action – Late Akbar Bakshi

Nominated

 Best Director – Abbas–Mustan
 Best Supporting Actress – Raakhee
 Best Music Director – Anu Malik

References

External links 
 

1998 films
1990s Hindi-language films
Films directed by Abbas–Mustan
Films shot in Sydney
Films scored by Anu Malik
Indian Army in films
Films set in Sydney
Films about military personnel
Indian action thriller films
Indian films about revenge
Films with screenplays by Sachin Bhowmick
Films scored by Surinder Sodhi
Hindi films remade in other languages
1998 action thriller films